Guillaume Vigneault, (born August 5, 1970 in Montreal, Quebec) is a Canadian novelist. He is the son of Gilles Vigneault.

Studies and works
After receiving a bachelor's degree in literary studies at the Université du Québec à Montréal and beginning a master's degree in the same subject, he decided to be a novelist. When he was young, his favourite writers were Albert Camus, Ernest Hemingway and Fyodor Dostoyevsky. He is a musician and used to be a bartender in a pub next to his University campus near the Montreal area of Plateau Mont-Royal.

His novel Chercher le Vent was published in October 2001. In 2003 it was published in English by Douglas and McIntyre, under the title Necessary Betrayals.

In 2005 he wrote the complete text for "La dictée des Amériques". He wrote the screenplay for the 2016 film Wild Run: The Legend (Chasse-Galerie: La Légende), the first feature film adaptation of the legend of Chasse-galerie.

In 2020, Vigneault, Guillaume de Fontenay and Jean Barbe received a Canadian Screen Award nomination for Best Adapted Screenplay at the 8th Canadian Screen Awards, and a Prix Iris nomination for Best Screenplay at the 22nd Quebec Cinema Awards, for the film Sympathy for the Devil (Sympathie pour le diable).

Books
Carnets de naufrage (Diary of a Shipwreck), Boréal, 2000
Chercher le vent (Necessary Betrayals), Boréal, 2001

References

External links
 
 L'Île : Guillaume Vigneault 
 Librairie Gaïa, 2004 
 2002's Vancouver International Writers Festival  

1970 births
Living people
Canadian male novelists
Canadian novelists in French
Université du Québec à Montréal alumni
Writers from Montreal
Canadian male screenwriters
Canadian screenwriters in French
21st-century Canadian novelists
21st-century Canadian screenwriters
21st-century Canadian male writers
French Quebecers